J. E. Mainer (July 20, 1898 – June 12, 1971) was an American old time fiddler who followed in the wake of Gid Tanner and his Skillet Lickers.

Biography
Joseph Emmett Mainer grew up on a farm in the mountains near Weaverville, North Carolina, United States, and learned to play the banjo and fiddle from an early age. Since Wade, his brother, also was interested in learning to play the banjo, he left that to Wade and concentrated on the fiddle. Soon, Mainer began performing at local country barn dances. He found work at a textile mill in Knoxville, Tennessee, but moved to Concord, North Carolina in 1922 for another work in a mill.

Mainer's fame as a fiddler rose and sponsored by the Crazy Water Crystals in 1933, he and his newly formed band consisting of J. E. on fiddle, Wade Mainer on banjo, and Zeke Morris on guitar, made their radio debut on WBT in Charlotte, North Carolina, calling themselves J.E. Mainer and his Crazy Mountaineers. The band appeared on several radio stations in the following years until 1935, when they received a recording contract. In August the same year, the Mountaineers, with the addition of "Daddy" John Love, recorded for Bluebird Records. Wade Mainer and Zeke Morris temporarily left the band in the early 1936 to form a duo. In the meantime, Ollie Bunn, Howard Bumgardner and Clarence Todd replaced Wade, Zeke and "Daddy" John Love on the next recording session. In the summer of 1936, Wade and Zeke returned to record with "the mountaineers". The next year, in 1937, Wade Mainer formed the "Sons of the Mountaineers". Shortly, a new change of personnel occurred when Leonard "Lester" Stokes and George Morris became members of "the mountaineers" calling themselves "Handsome and Sambo". They added Snuffy Jenkins on banjo on the following recording session. In late 1938, Stokes and Morris were once more replaced by Clyde Moody and Jay Hugh Hall. The band continued to perform on radio stations in both North and South Carolina.

The Mountaineers disbanded at the outbreak of World War II, but Mainer continued to record in the late 1940s, together with his sons, Glenn and Curly, for King Records. Between 1967 and 1971, the year of his death, literally hundreds of post-war recordings were released on Rural Rhythm Records.

Mainer was inducted into the North Carolina Music Hall of Fame on October 11, 2012.

Original discography

J. E. Mainer's Mountaineers

Daddy John Love

Leonard Stokes/George Morris

Album discography

References

Other sources and external links
J.E.Mainer's Mountaineers, Liner notes, Old Timey LP-106
 Tony Russell, Bob Pinson, Country Music Records: A Discography, 1921-1942, Country Music Hall of Fame & Museum, 2004
 Wiley and Zeke, The Morris Brothers
The Online Discographical Project Retrieved on January 5, 2009.

1898 births
1971 deaths
Southern old-time fiddlers
King Records artists